Fernand Auguste Charles Buyle  was a Belgian footballer, born on 3 March 1918 in Molenbeek-Saint-Jean, date of death 22 January 1992.

He was a striker for Daring Club de Bruxelles from the 1934–1953 seasons and played sixteen times for Belgium including one match at the 1938 World Cup.

Honours 
 International from 1937 to 1945 (16 caps, 1 goal)
 Participation in the 1938 FIFA World Cup (played 1 match)
 Champions of Belgium in 1936 and 1937 with Daring Club Bruxelles
 Belgian Cup Winners in 1935 with Daring Club Bruxelles

References

External links
 

Belgium international footballers
1918 births
People from Molenbeek-Saint-Jean
1992 deaths
Belgian footballers
1938 FIFA World Cup players
Association football forwards
Footballers from Brussels